Pseudocercospora pandoreae is a fungus.

See also 
 Pseudocercospora arecacearum
 Pseudocercospora gunnerae

References 

pandoreae
Fungal plant pathogens and diseases